Mantong Township ((); also known as Manton Township and Mantung Township) is a township of the Pa Laung Self-Administered Zone in the Shan State of eastern Burma (Myanmar). The principal town and administrative seat is Mantong (Manton).

Prior to August 2010, Kyaukme District included both Mantong Township and Namhsan Township; and both of them were transferred that month to the newly created Pa Laung Self-Administered Zone.

References

Townships of Shan State